"It Takes All Night Long" is a song by English glam rock singer Gary Glitter, written by Glitter with Mike Leander and Eddie (Edward John) Seago and produced by Mike Leander. It was released as the second single from his fourth studio album, Silver Star (1977), peaking at No. 25 on the UK Singles Chart.

Track listing
"It Takes All Night Long (Part I)" – 3:04
"It Takes All Night Long (Part II)" – 2:43

Chart performance

http://www.dutchcharts.nl/weekchart.asp?cat=st&date=19770319&year=1977

References

External links
 

1976 singles
Gary Glitter songs
Songs written by Mike Leander
Song recordings produced by Mike Leander
Songs written by Gary Glitter
Arista Records singles
1976 songs
Songs written by Eddie Seago